Gagra (Abkhaz and Russian: Гагра) is a town in Abkhazia/Georgia, sprawling for 5 km on the northeast coast of the Black Sea, at the foot of the Caucasus Mountains. Its subtropical climate made Gagra a popular health resort in Imperial Russian and Soviet times.

It had a population of 26,636 in 1989, but this has fallen considerably due to the ethnic cleansing of Georgians in Abkhazia and other demographic shifts during and after the War in Abkhazia (1992–93).

Gagra is the centre of the district of the same name. It is located in the western part of Region of Abkhazia, and river Psou serves as a border with Krasnodar Krai of Russia.

Etymology 
According to some Georgian scholars, Gagra is derived from Gakra meaning "walnut" in the Svan language. According to the Soviet writer Bondaryev, the name of the city originates from the local Gagaa clan. According to Professor V. Kvarchija, Gagra (< *ga-kʼə-ra) means ‘the holder of the coast’ in Abkhaz (Gagra was mentioned as Kakara, Kakkari on old maps).

History 
The town was established as a Greek colony in the kingdom of Colchis, called Triglite, inhabited by Greeks and Colchians. Colchis came under the control of the kingdom of Pontus in the 1st century BC before being absorbed by the Roman Empire, which renamed the town as Nitica. Its geographical position led the Romans to fortify the town, which was repeatedly attacked by Goths and other invaders. The town and the whole region of Colchis remained part of Byzantine Empire.

It became a major trading settlement in which Genoese and Venetian merchants were prominent, trading in the town's main exports - wood, honey, wax and slaves. The name "Gagra" appeared for the first time on a map in 1308, on a map of the Caucasus made by the Italian Pietro Visconti, which is now in the Library of Saint Mark in Venice.

Gagra within the Russian Empire 

In the 16th century, Gagra and the rest of western Georgia were conquered by the Ottoman Empire. The western merchants were expelled and the town entered a prolonged period of decline, with much of the local population fleeing into the mountains. By the 18th century, the town had been reduced to little more than a village surrounded by forests and disease-ridden swamps. Its fortunes were restored in the 19th century when the Russian Empire expanded into the region, annexing the whole of Georgia. The swamps were drained and the town was rebuilt around a new military hospital. Its population, however, was still small; in 1866, a census recorded that 336 men and 280 women, mostly local families or army officers and their dependents, lived in Gagra. The town suffered badly in the Russo-Turkish War, 1877-1878, when Turkish troops invaded, destroyed the town and expelled the local population. Russia won the war, however, and rebuilt Gagra again. 

In 1904 the town was discovered by Duke Alexander of Oldenburg, a member of the Russian royalty. He saw the potential of the region's sub-tropical climate and decided to build a high-class resort there. Having raised a large sum of money from the government, he built a palace there for himself and constructed a number of other buildings in an eclectic variety of architectural styles from around Europe. A park was laid out with tropical trees, and parrots and monkeys were imported to give it an exotic feel. Despite the expensive work, the resort was not initially a success, although it did later attract a growing number of foreign tourists visiting on cruises of the Black Sea. Following the founding of the resort, the area was ceded from Sukhum Okrug to Black Sea Governorate in 1904.

Gagra under the Soviet Union 
In the Russian Revolution of 1905, a local uprising produced a revolutionary government in the town, which founded a short-lived Republic of Gagra. This was soon defeated and the revolutionaries were arrested en masse. The First World War a few years later was a disaster for Gagra, destroying the tourist trade on which it depended. The Russian Revolution shortly afterwards saw the Bolsheviks take over the town; despite a brief French attempt to repel them during the Russian Civil War, the town was firmly incorporated into the new Soviet Union within Georgian SSR.

Bolshevik leader Vladimir Lenin issued a decree in 1919 establishing a "worker's resort" in Gagra, nationalising the resort that had been built by Oldenburg. It became a popular holiday resort for Soviet citizens and during World War II gained a new role as a site for the rehabilitation of wounded soldiers. After the war, various state-run sanatoriums were built there. The resort grew and was developed intensively as part of the "Soviet Riviera". A 1985 musical film Winter Evening in Gagra further popularized the resort.

Gagra in post-soviet Abkhazia 
In the late 1980s, tensions grew between the Georgian and Abkhazian communities in the region. An all-out war erupted between 1992-1993 which ended in a defeat of the Georgian government's forces. Hundreds of thousands of ethnic Georgians were expelled from their homes in Abkhazia and thousands were massacred in an outbreak of mass ethnic cleansing. Gagra and the Abkhazian capital Sukhumi were at the centre of the fighting and suffered heavy damage.

Monuments 

The chief landmarks of Gagra are:
Ruins of the Abaata Fortress (4th-5th century AD)
A 6th-century Church of Gagra, said to be the oldest in Abkhazia
Marlinsky defensive tower (1841)
19th-century palace of the Prince of Oldenburg

International relations

Twin towns — Sister cities
Gagra is twinned with the following city:
 Vladimir, Russia.

See also
 Gagra District
 Sochi conflict

Notes

References

External links 

webcamera in Gagra 

Populated places in Gagra District
Populated coastal places in Georgia (country)
Greek colonies in Colchis
Georgian Black Sea coast